Pól Brennan (born 22 April 1956) is an Irish singer, songwriter and producer. He is the brother of Enya,  Moya Brennan, Brídín Brennan and Ciarán Brennan. He is a member of the family band Clannad, and co-wrote the hit song "Theme from Harry's Game". He left the group in 1990, but rejoined in 2011. Since the early 1990s, Pól has gained critical acclaim as a solo artist when he joined Japanese musician Joji Hirota and Chinese musician Guo Yue, and released an album, Trísan.

The music on this album is a mixture of Celtic and Japanese musical styles. More recently, Pól wrote the soundtrack of the movie When the Sky Falls (1999) and performed at the 2001 Carnvaha festival in Wexford, Ireland. He also produced music for the 2018 film Penance. He has toured extensively all over the world and is also joined by many popular artists. In 2008 Pól won the IFTA award for Best Original Score for his work on the Irish film Kings.

References

External links
Pól Brennan Discography at Discogs

1956 births
Living people
Clannad members
Irish folk singers
Irish-language singers
Irish male singer-songwriters
People from Gweedore